The Men's 50m Freestyle event at the 2007 Pan American Games took place at the Maria Lenk Aquatic Park in Rio de Janeiro, Brazil, with the final being swum on July 22.

Medalists

Results

Notes

References
For the Record, Swimming World Magazine, September 2007 (p. 48+49)
agendapan

Freestyle, Men's 50m